Nizhyn Okruha was an okruha (regional district) in 1923–1930 in northeastern Ukraine. Its administrative centre was located in Nizhyn. 

The okruha was created in 1923 as part of the Chernigov Governorate. In 1925-1930 it served as a first-level administrative division within the Ukrainian SSR.

In 1926 okruha consisted of 12 raions.

References

External links
 Nizhyn Okruha at Encyclopedia of History of Ukraine
 Government of the Nizhyn Okruha at the Handbook on history of the Communist Party and the Soviet Union 1898–1991

States and territories established in 1923
States and territories disestablished in 1930
1923 establishments in Ukraine
1930 disestablishments in Ukraine
Okruhas of Ukraine
Okruhas of Chernigov Governorate
History of Chernihiv Oblast